Wisdom Fofo Agbo  ( Fofo, born June 25, 1979) is a former Ghanaian-born Hong Kong professional footballer who played as a defensive midfielder.

Club career
Fofo went on a trial to Guizhou Zhicheng on 13 June 2013. However, he did not play in the friendly match against Guizhou Renhe since he had to come back to Hong Kong to handle some personal issues. After an unsuccessful trail at Guizhou Zhicheng, Fofo is reportedly close to joining Harbin Yiteng. On 8 July 2013, Fofo officially signed a six-month contract with Harbin Yiteng, becoming the second naturalised Hong Kong player, after his compatriot Godfred Karikari, to play in China League One.

On 27 February 2015, Fofo transferred to Chinese Super League side Liaoning Whowin.

International career

Fofo has spent more than seven years playing football in Hong Kong. He received his Hong Kong Permanent Identity Card on 7 February 2011. He successfully obtained his Hong Kong passport in May 2013 and thus making him eligible to play for Hong Kong. He received his first international cap for the match against Philippines but he didn't come off the bench eventually. He made his debut for Hong Kong on 6 September 2013 against Myanmar.

Honours

International
Hong Kong
 Guangdong-Hong Kong Cup: 2013

Career statistics

Club
As of 11 September 2009

International
As of 5 March 2014

References

External links
Wisdom Fofo Agbo at HKFA

1979 births
Living people
Hong Kong footballers
Hong Kong international footballers
Ghanaian footballers
Hong Kong people of Ghanaian descent
Ghanaian emigrants to Hong Kong
Association football midfielders
Hong Kong Rangers FC players
TSW Pegasus FC players
Southern District FC players
Zhejiang Yiteng F.C. players
South China AA players
Liaoning F.C. players
China League One players
Chinese Super League players
Hong Kong First Division League players
Hong Kong Premier League players
Ghanaian expatriate sportspeople in Hong Kong
Expatriate footballers in Hong Kong
People with acquired permanent residency of Hong Kong
Hong Kong expatriate sportspeople in China
Hong Kong expatriate footballers
Naturalized footballers of Hong Kong
Hong Kong League XI representative players
People from Tamale, Ghana